The FIP World Heavyweight Championship is a professional wrestling world heavyweight championship owned by the Full Impact Pro (FIP) promotion. It is currently the highest ranked championship in FIP.

History 
The title was introduced on September 25, 2004 at FIP's "Emergence: Part Two" event as the FIP Heavyweight Championship. It was renamed the FIP World Heavyweight Championship on March 3, 2007, when then-champion Roderick Strong defeated Pac in Liverpool, England at the Ring of Honor (ROH) promotion's "Fifth Year Festival: Liverpool" event. Overall, there have been 23 reigns shared among 17 wrestlers. Title changes happen mostly at FIP-promoted events, which are usually released on DVD. The title has changed hands four times at non-FIP events. Reigns two and four occurred at ROH-promoted events, while reigns 10 and 11 happened at Dragon Gate events.

Since being renamed as a "World Championship" after a UK defense in March 2007, the title has been defended internationally multiple times. Not only has the championship been successfully defended in Japan, China, Canada, Mexico but the title has also changed hands in both Japan and China.

Inaugural FIP Heavyweight Champion Tournament (2004)

Title history
The inaugural champion was Homicide, who defeated CM Punk in the finals of a two-night tournament that concluded on September 25, 2004 at FIP's "Emergence: Part Two" event. Roderick Strong holds the record of most reigns, with three. Jon Davis's second reign is the longest singular reign at 632 days, while Erick Stevens reign is the shortest at 35 days. Davis also holds the record for longest combined reign at 821 days. Davis is also the oldest champion at 40, while Austin Theory is the youngest, having won it at 20.

Karam is the current champion in his first reign. He defeated Jon Davis at WWN Supershow: Battle of the Belts on November 14, 2021, in Clearwater, FL.

Reigns

Combined reigns

References
General

Specific

External links
Full Impact Pro.com
 FIP World Heavyweight Championship

FIP World Heavyweight
WWNLive championships
World heavyweight wrestling championships
World professional wrestling championships